Eremias yarkandensis (commonly known as the Yarkend racerunner or Yarkand sandlizard) is a species of lizard found in China and Kyrgyzstan.

References

Eremias
Reptiles described in 1875
Taxa named by William Thomas Blanford